Danyar Musajan (born 12 October 1997) is a Chinese footballer currently playing as a midfielder for Chinese club Guangxi Hengchen.

Career statistics

Club
.

References

1997 births
Living people
Chinese footballers
Association football midfielders
China League One players
Xinjiang Tianshan Leopard F.C. players